The sulphur-bearded reedhaunter (Limnoctites sulphuriferus) is a species of non-migratory bird in the family Furnariidae. It is found in the Pampas and adjacent areas of eastern Argentina, southern Uruguay, and Rio Grande do Sul, Brazil. Its natural habitats are marshes with dense reed beds. Previously included in the genus Cranioleuca, but genetic evidence revealed that L. sulphuriferus is the sister species of Limnoctites rectirostris.

References

Further reading

 Remsen, J. V., Jr. 2003. Family Furnariidae (ovenbirds). Pages 162–357 in J. del Hoyo, A. Elliott and D. A. Christie eds. Handbook of the birds of the world, Vol. 8, broadbills to tapaculos. Lynx Edicions, Barcelona.

sulphur-bearded reedhaunter
Birds of Argentina
Birds of Uruguay
sulphur-bearded reedhaunter
sulphur-bearded reedhaunter
Taxonomy articles created by Polbot
Taxobox binomials not recognized by IUCN